Robley (also Issabel, Marvin, or Point Isabel) is an unincorporated community in southeastern Richmond County, Virginia, United States.  It lies along State Route 3 southeast of the town of Warsaw, the county seat of Richmond County.  Its elevation is 115 feet (35 m).

References

Unincorporated communities in Richmond County, Virginia
Unincorporated communities in Virginia